Albanais was a  74-gun ship of the line of the French Navy.

Career 
Ordered on 31 July 1806, Albanais was one of the ships built in the various shipyards captured by the First French Empire in Holland and Italy in a crash programme to replenish the ranks of the French Navy.

She was commissioned on 1 October 1808. In March 1808, part of her crew transferred on Tilsitt, and she had to complement her complement with Danish sailors. She served in Missiessy's Escault squadron under Pierre Lhermite.

In 1814, according to the terms of the Treaty of Paris, she was surrendered to the Dutch and renamed Batavier. She was broken up in 1817.

Notes, citations, and references

Notes

Citations

References
 

Ships of the line of the French Navy
Téméraire-class ships of the line
1808 ships